Ibrahim Jammal is a Nigerian actor and production manager. He is known for his roles in The Delivery Boy, Baba and Green White Green.

Education 
Ibrahim Jammal has a background in television production and also received his first degree in Computer Information Systems from Babcock University.

Career 
Jammal began his film career as a production manager. He later blended acting and he has featured in several films.

Filmography 
 The Delivery Boy
 Baba
 Green White Green
 The Lost Okoroshi
 The Last Tree
 The Milkmaid
 There is Something Wrong with the Bamideles
 Glamour Girls Crime and Justice Lagos''

References 

Nigerian film producers
Babcock University alumni
Nigerian male film actors
21st-century Nigerian male actors
Nigerian television producers
Year of birth missing (living people)
Living people